Below is list of suburbs in Wagga Wagga, New South Wales.

Suburbs 
 Ashmont
 Boorooma
 Bomen
 Bourkelands
 Cartwrights Hill
 East Wagga Wagga
 Estella
 Forest Hill
 Glenfield Park
 Gobbagombalin
 Gumly Gumly
 Kapooka
 Kooringal
 Lake Albert
 Lloyd
 Mount Austin
 North Wagga Wagga
 San Isidore
 Springvale 
 Tatton
 Tolland
 Turvey Park
 Wagga Wagga
Glen oak

Below is list of localities within the city boundaries of Wagga Wagga, New South Wales.

Localities 
 Alfredtown
 Book Book
 Collingullie
 Downside
 Euberta
 Gregadoo
 Ladysmith
 Mangoplah
  Oura
  Rowan
 Tarcutta
 Uranquinty

Information about locality boundaries has been sourced from the UBD New South Wales Country Road Atlas (16th edition, 2006) and City of Wagga Wagga website.

External links 
 Wagga Wagga Street Map
 Wagga Wagga City Community Profile Map

 
Geography of New South Wales
Wagga